"Souljacker Part I" is a song by American rock band Eels. It was the only single released from their 2001 album Souljacker.

Music video 

The German filmmaker Wim Wenders shot a video of the song with the band performing in an abandoned East-Berlin prison in 2001.

Release 

"Souljacker Part I" reached number 30 in the UK Albums Chart.

The song is included in the 2007 films Hot Fuzz and The Condemned, the 2011 film Drive Angry, and in the pilot episode of the Showtime series United States of Tara.

Track listings
 CD 1

 "Souljacker Part I"
 "I Write the B-Sides"
 "Can't Help Falling in Love"
 "Souljacker Part I" (video)

 CD 2
 "Souljacker Part I"
 "Jennifer Eccles"
 "My Beloved Monstrosity"
 "My Beloved Spider" (hidden track)

 7" vinyl
"Souljacker part I"
"I Write the B-Sides"

References

External links 
 

Eels (band) songs
2001 singles
Songs written by Mark Oliver Everett
Song recordings produced by Mark Oliver Everett
2001 songs
DreamWorks Records singles